The Pilgrimage is the sixth studio album by American rapper and Wu-Tang Clan member Cappadonna. It was released on November 15, 2011. The album features guest appearances from Matlock, Killa Black, Chedda Bang, Solomon Childs, Inspectah Deck and Elite.

Track listing

References

2011 albums
Cappadonna albums